The Kenya National Union of Teachers (KNUT) is the largest teachers' trade union in Kenya. It was formed on December 4, 1957. Its first secretary-general was Joseph Kioni. The union held its first strike in 1963, soon before Kenyan independence. Other major strikes have been held in 1966, 1969, 1997, 1998, 2002 and 2009.

List of secretaries-general
Secretary-general is the highest post in the Kenya National Union of Teachers. Those who have held the post are:
Joseph Kioni (1958-1969)
Ambrose Adeya Adongo (1970-2001)
Francis Ng'ang'a (2001-2008)
Lawrence Majali (2008–2010)
David Okuta Osiany (2010-2013)
Wilson Sossion (2013–)
Collins Oyuu (2021-)

External links
 Website

References 

Trade unions in Kenya
Education in Kenya
Trade unions established in 1957
Education trade unions
1957 establishments in Kenya